Helianthus is a genus of plants comprising sunflowers.

Helianthus may also refer to:

 USS Helianthus (SP-585), U.S. Navy patrol boat
 Helianthus III, a yacht listed on the National Register of Historic Places
 Heliaster helianthus, a species of starfish
 Stichodactyla helianthus, a species of sea anemone

See also
 Actinia helianthus (disambiguation)